Isabella Páez (born 29 August 1995) is a Venezuelan swimmer. She competed in the women's 200 metre butterfly event at the 2018 FINA World Swimming Championships (25 m), in Hangzhou, China.

References

External links
 

1995 births
Living people
Venezuelan female swimmers
Female butterfly swimmers
Sportspeople from Caracas
Duke Blue Devils women's swimmers
Pan American Games competitors for Venezuela
Swimmers at the 2015 Pan American Games
Swimmers at the 2019 Pan American Games
Competitors at the 2018 Central American and Caribbean Games
Central American and Caribbean Games medalists in swimming
Central American and Caribbean Games gold medalists for Venezuela
Central American and Caribbean Games silver medalists for Venezuela
Central American and Caribbean Games bronze medalists for Venezuela
21st-century Venezuelan women